, often referred to simply as , is a Japanese manga series written by Rikito Nakamura and illustrated by Yukiko Nozawa. It has been serialized in Shueisha's seinen manga magazine Weekly Young Jump since December 2019, with its chapters collected in 13 tankōbon volumes as of March 2023. The manga has been licensed for English release in North America by Seven Seas Entertainment. An anime television series adaptation by Bibury Animation Studios is set to premiere in 2023.

The series focuses on high school student Rentarō Aijō, who in his lifetime fell in love and confessed to exactly 100 girls, only to be rejected by all of them. While praying in a shrine, Rentarō is approached by the God of Love, who reveals that he, due to an error, is destined to have 100 soulmates. However, he also tells Rentarō that if he does not return the feelings of any of his soulmates, they will suffer an accident and die. Not wanting this to happen, Rentarō is determined not to let any of his soulmates die as he meets and dates them all at the same time.

Synopsis
Rentarō Aijō has confessed to (and been rejected by) 100 girls in his lifetime. On the last day of middle school, he visits a shrine and prays that he get a girlfriend during his time at high school. Suddenly, the God of Love appears and tells Rentarō that the reason for his non-existent love life is because everyone is only supposed to have one soulmate in their life, but due to an error on the God of Love's part, Rentarō is destined to have 100.

Sure enough, on the first day of high school, Rentarō meets the wealthy Hakari Hanazono and tsundere Karane Inda. Both girls instantly fall in love with him, and Rentarō is attracted to both of them, but unable to decide between them. That evening, he visits the God of Love again and is informed that if he does not return the feelings of one of his soulmates, they will die in an accident. Not wanting such a fate to befall Hakari and Karane, Rentarō decides to date both of them at the same time, with their blessing. As the story continues, more girls are introduced and become Rentarō's girlfriends, establishing a polyamorous relationship.

Characters

Protagonist

Rentarō has fallen in love and been rejected one hundred times prior to the beginning of the story, thus causing him to strive to better himself each time. Having been overly blessed by a god of a local temple for all of his prayers, by the end of his high school life, Rentarō is destined to have one-hundred girlfriends. When Rentarō makes eye contact with one of his girlfriends for the first time, a shock-like feeling overcomes him and his new girlfriend. Rentarō genuinely loves each and every new girlfriend he meets, even completely passing a lie detector test when questioned about the legitimacy of his feelings. He often goes out of his way, sometimes to extremes, to keep them all happy. He also detests doing lewd things to his girlfriends unless absolutely necessary, but always has extreme contingency plans to minimize the nature of the situation.

Girlfriends 1–10

One of Rentarō's first two girlfriends, along with Karane Inda. Hakari is from a wealthy family and likes to present a prim and proper appearance, but is rather physical in her affection and can sometimes be perverted. In addition to loving Rentarō, she is somewhat attracted to Karane. Early in the story, Hakari's mother Hahari disapproved of her relationship with the then five-timing Rentarō and temporarily forbade her from seeing him, leading to Rentarō and his girlfriends rescuing her. After proving the honesty of his feelings for his girlfriends to Hahari, Hakari rejoins the harem, but with her mother now a member. On occasion, she cooperates with her mother to manipulate Rentarō and his girlfriends into doing perverted actions, though she is not nearly as pushy as her mother.

One of Rentarō's first two girlfriends, along with Hakari Hanazono. Karane has a typical tsundere personality, though not violent by any means. She has difficulty lying and hiding her true feelings. While she initially disliked the idea of Rentarō having multiple girlfriends, she soon became accepting of them. In addition to loving Rentarō, she is somewhat attracted to Hakari. She was slightly insecure about her tsundere traits because she felt that she could not express her feelings properly like Rentarō's other girlfriends, but after losing those traits thanks to a drug from Kusuri, she eventually acknowledged that her personality is what made her special and regained them with help from Rentarō's other girlfriends. She is noted for having deceptively high strength despite her slender appearance.

Rentarō's third girlfriend. Shy to the point of muteness, Shizuka was constantly bullied by her fellow students and abused by her mother before meeting Rentarō. She is a bookworm who initially could only communicate through passages of her favorite book by pointing at them when trying to respond to someone. Rentarō develops a speaking app for her so she can freely communicate by digitally reciting the lines she touches as well as a word bank. She loves fantasy romance books in particular, but is unable to swim.

Rentarō's fourth girlfriend. Nano is stoic to the point of emotionlessness. She is intelligent and highly optimized in her daily life, removing any sort of unnecessary movements and actions to achieve utter efficiency. She initially has trouble concentrating when she first falls for Rentarō, throwing her lifestyle into chaos, but after going on a date with him and stopping him from burning the photos they took on it, she accepts her feelings and returns to normal. She is afraid of heights.

Rentarō's fifth girlfriend. Kusuri is the president of Chemistry club at Rentarō's high school who specialises in creating drugs which have strange effects when consumed. She is eighteen years old, but due to having consumed a drug that was supposed to make her immortal, she spends much of her time in an eight-year-old body. She also has a neutralization drug that can revert most of her drug effect's, though the effects of the failed immortal drug can only be temporarily negated, allowing Kusuri to appear in her true 18-year-old appearance temporarily before reverting back. It is later revealed that both of her parents and grandmother also took the immortality drug and are also eight-year-old in appearance as well.

Rentarō's sixth girlfriend and Hakari's mother. She gave birth to Hakari when she was thirteen, due to having fallen in love with a terminally ill fellow student. Knowing that he did not have long to live, she had herself artificially inseminated with his sperm so that they could be a family before he died. Initially, she disapproved of Hakari's relationship with Rentarō, believing that he was two-timing her daughter with four other girls, but changed her mind when she fell in love with Rentarō herself, going as far as buying the school and becoming the new chairwoman in order to stay close to him. She adores cute things and shares some of her daughter's perverted tendencies if not to a higher degree. She can also be overbearingly affectionate to Rentarō and his girlfriends, usually trying to be the mother figure to them all.

Rentarō's seventh girlfriend. Kurumi is a middle-schooler with a very high metabolism, which causes her to get hungry very easily - even hearing a word that sounds similar to a certain type of food will cause her to crave that food. As a result, she constantly wears headphones and has her hood up in order to block out as much food-related talk as possible. She has two personalities, depending on whether or not she is hungry. When she has eaten, she is a very kind and sweet-natured person, but when she is hungry, she is short-tempered and abrupt - unfortunately, due to being near constantly hungry, she is near constantly short-tempered.

Rentarō's eighth girlfriend. Mei is the Hanazono family maid having been found by Hahari after she was abused and abandoned by her biological parents. She is extremely loyal to Hahari and will carry out any request made by Hahari without question, no matter how absurd. In fact, she becomes suicidal if she fails to fulfill the task, often resulting in Hahari having to rescind the order to stop her. Her most striking physical feature are her rainbow colored irises which are usually not seen as she almost always has her eyes closed, (nearly always requiring some sort of shocking revelation to open) though this does not prevent her from driving or piloting a helicopter.

Rentarō's ninth girlfriend. Iku is the last remaining member of the school baseball team as the other members decided to study baseball in America. She is masochistic, finding pleasure in overworking herself to exhaustion and otherwise being mildly hurt. Even being "heartbroken" by Rentarō causes her great pleasure, though she becomes a legitimate girlfriend for Rentarō. A bonus story in the fifth volume reveals that her masochism began when she developed a love of baseball at a young age. Initially she found practicing too hard and painful, but after an encouraging pep talk from her older brother, she decided to keep at it. However, because she had been told that she had to keep trying even if it hurt, she came to consider pain a good thing.

Rentarō's tenth girlfriend. Mimimi is a girl who is obsessed with beauty, but is aware that beauty cannot simply be bought, and considers inner beauty just as important as outer beauty. As such, she puts a lot of work into making herself beautiful, earning her own money, cutting costs wherever she can, doing facial regimens, and teaching herself elocution. She initially considers Nano her rival in beauty, seemingly due to Nano having beaten her in their junior high school beauty contest. It is later revealed that her hatred actually stems from Nano having snubbed her after the contest, and she decides to let bygones be bygones when Nano apologises to her, although she insists on maintaining a friendly rivalry.

Girlfriends 11–20

Rentarō's eleventh girlfriend. Meme is a shrinking violet girl who goes out of her way to be a "background character". She has a pronounced figure that she actively binds down to reduce attention to her and her most prominent physical characteristic is her bangs that constantly cover her eyes except in a few situations such as when Rentarō first made eye contact with her when he saved her from a flying sign in a windstorm, though her eyes are never seen directly by the reader. She knits small plushies as a hobby. When pressured or embarrassed, Meme will suddenly vanish in an instant and throw one of these plushies where she was standing as a means of misdirection while she hides somewhere nearby.

Rentarō's twelfth girlfriend and his junior high school aged cousin. She has extreme tidiness tendencies which results in her getting so frustrated when anything is disorganized or sloppy that she has to intervene and correct them. She is the class president of her class as a result, but secretly dislikes the high expectations they put on her. If she loses her glasses, her anxiety is suddenly released and she becomes a crying mess. While Rentarō had his reservations against dating his cousin, despite knowing the fate she would have if he did not accept her, he relented after witnessing her honest, pure confession. Her father (and only parent) Hiro, Rentarō's uncle, approves of her relationship with him after a young Rentarō once pushed him away from a speeding truck, believing Rentarō to be the best boy in the world as a result.

Rentarō's thirteenth girlfriend. Nadeshiko is a transfer teacher who becomes the new Japanese teacher at his school. She claims to be American, but in reality she is a pure-blooded Japanese and is merely obsessed with America. As a child, her parents forced her to learn and uphold the behaviour of a proper Japanese lady, going as far as locking her in a storeroom when she made mistakes. On one occasion, she discovered an American movie, and upon watching it, became so inspired by the freedom American children were allowed compared to her own upbringing that she began modelling her entire life and identity after it, which led to her parents disowning her.

Rentarō's fourteenth girlfriend. Yamame is bigger and taller than Rentarō's other girlfriends, but is described by Rentarō as a gentle soul who loves nature. Yamame is Iku's classmate and a member of the school's gardening club and is overly caring to all forms of nature. Even the weeds that grow in the garden are considered precious by her and she even made a garden area just for weeds. In her youth, she used to dislike her large body, but after helping a baby bird back into its nest, she became proud of it since she can protect and help out nature. In her past, she witnessed a wild fire and developed pyrophobia since such fires kill plants and animals. After Rentarō protected Yamame from a fire comically created by the school's vice principal, she confessed her feelings to Rentarō as it was the first time someone had ever protected her.

Rentarō's fifteenth girlfriend. Momiji is Kurumi's classmate and a skilled masseuse. Her massages puts her clients into a state of extreme bliss, though this is likely due to her handsy nature, stating that she enjoys the "softness" of a woman's body. After falling in love with Rentarō, she finds his unique body a perfect tool to practice on. Her dream is to become a popular masseuse and personally massage gravure models.

Rentarō's sixteenth girlfriend and Kusuri's grandmother. She is eighty-nine years old, but due to having taken a prototype of Kusuri's immortality drug, she resembles an eight-year-old girl. Due to the strength of the prototype, her appearance is not reverted by the neutralization drug. Her age is shown through her knowledge and mature womanly charm, something completely different from the more perverse Hahari. She met her husband in a warzone when she was a medic, but has since been widowed. She is technologically illiterate. She has a variation of her granddaughter's verbal tic, ending her sentences with "", a more antiquated version.

Rentarō's seventeenth girlfriend. Kishika is Kusuri's classmate and captain of the school kendo team. She has five siblings, all of whom she looks after by herself due to her parents not being around. She has a secret desire to be pampered, spoiled, and doted on, but has kept this part a secret and is extremely reactive to anyone who attempts to touch her. Her desire to be pampered led her to making an fake hand to pet herself and comforting voice lines to listen to when she is upset. After Rentarō discovers this, he becomes her boyfriend and pampers her, causing her to develop an infantile reaction when pampered.

Rentarō's eighteenth girlfriend. Āshī dresses and speaks like a gyaru, but also has a personality self-described as "low-blood pressure” and has a constantly relaxed expression, even when stating that she is motivated or excited. After meeting Rentarō and going to a flea-market to sell her unused cute things, she became inspired to one day run a store that sells cute things and hopes Rentarō will help support her new dream. She prefers Rentarō to call her Āko.

Rentarō's nineteenth girlfriend. Uto identifies herself as a wandering bard, dressing up in such clothing and plays the ocarina, albeit very poorly. In reality, she is a second-year middle school student who is a Chūnibyō. She tends to talk in a poetic, roundabout fashion or using the Socratic method.

Rentarō's twentieth girlfriend. She is the granddaughter of the previous head maid of the Hanazono household who desired to become a maid herself after meeting Mei. She idolizes Mei and is her self-proclaimed little sister and is highly protective of her. She despised Rentarō for dating Mei, but she fell in love with him. Because she tends to space-out thinking about Mei and later Rentarō, she is clumsy, resulting in her dramatically slipping and tripping at inopportune times. Despite having the same last name phonetically, Mai and Mei are not blood related and the kanji of their family names are different.

Girlfriends 21–

Rentarō's twenty-first girlfriend. Momoha is a 27-year-old Social Studies teacher at Rentarō's school who teaches second year students with an emphasis on teaching ethics. Ironically, she tends to squander her money on gambling and alcohol, resulting in her being homeless, living in a tent by Yamame's garden as she is also the advisor of the Gardening Club. Despite her unethical behavior at times, she ultimately is also generous as she regularly uses her own money to supply the Gardening Club with tools and weeds the entire school before school starts on her own.

Rentarō's twenty-second girlfriend. Rin is a second year middle school student who practices the violin as both of her parents are also violinists. After watching a quick scene from the Resident Evil film as a child by accident, Rin derives pleasure from any sort of depiction of violence. While she has kept this mostly under wraps, Rentarō allows her to express her desires. She tends to exclaim "violen-suwa" when aroused, which is a combination of 'violence' and 'desu-wa', an elegant copula.

Rentarō's twenty-third girlfriend. Suu adores numbers, even flat out stating that she is romantically in love with numbers. She dislikes most other things, even rudely ignoring Rentarō's initial conversations with her just because he's not a number. After posturing himself to resemble numbers, Suu grows fond of Rentarō and asks to be his girlfriend.

Other characters
The God of Love
The god of a local shrine who informs Rentarō that due to his constant prayers to his shrine, and partially due to him being distracted when watching Castle in the Sky, he overly blessed Rentarō to meet 100 soulmates during his high school life. 
Baba An
The Vice Principal of Rentarō's high school. She has a very strange appearance and is known for chasing down students who misbehave in school, often punishing male students with sloppy kisses. She tends to run on all fours in a creepy manner.
The Gorira Alliance
A Japanese biker gang formed in the early 21st century led by a burly woman who resembles a gorilla. She is dating a petite boy whom she saved from a speeding car and fell in love with during the incident.
Hakari's Father
The unnamed boy with a terminal illness whom Hahari had fallen in love with when she was a schoolgirl. Before he died, Hahari was inseminated by him at the age of 13, which led to the birth of Hakari. Rentarō meets his spirit after rescuing Hakari and causing Hahari to fall in love with him. 
Hiro Īn
Chiyo's father and Rentarō's uncle. Hiro approves of Chiyo's relationship with Rentarō despite being cousins because Rentarō had pushed him out of the way of a speeding car when Rentarō was a young boy.
Toruru Kijineta
The president of the school newspaper club who tries to get pictures of Meme for the school paper, though in the story she appears in, Mimimi assists in helping Meme to hide.
Tina Quali
A former pop idol who trains Rentarō's girlfriends as idols, only to abandon them when the better quality girls refuse to leave the lesser quality girls off the stage.
Yukiko Nozawa
The illustrator of the manga. She first appears in chapter 69 when Rentarō visits her to help draw the manga so that his new girlfriend can practice massaging men, and later appears in chapter 94.
Akogare and Manesu
Two classmates from Chiyo's school who frequent a nearby park smoking cigarettes. Chiyo and Naddy both try to dissuade them from doing so using their own methods. At the end of the chapter they appear in, it is revealed that they were only pretending to smoke.
Kusuri's Parents
Yaku's son and daughter-in-law who, like their daughter, both develop drugs. First introduced in Chapter 74, they also took Kusuri's failed immortality drug and appear as eight year olds as a result. Unlike Yaku, Kusuri's parents took a similar immortality drug like Kusuri, thus they can temporarily revert to their true appearances with the negation drugs. Kusuri's father in particular is skilled in body augmentation drugs that are not negated by the negation drugs.
The Serious Group
A company headed by a distant relative of Iku. Their products and services are of astonishingly high quality to the point that people unaware of their practices are often subjected to problematic situations.
Kiraisugi-chou's Mayor
A Japanese town mayor. Despite his obsession with the yearly sports festival, his town has failed to win even once. He views Sukisugi-chou as a rival town.

Media

Manga
The 100 Girlfriends Who Really, Really, Really, Really, Really Love You is written by Rikito Nakamura and illustrated by Yukiko Nozawa. It has been serialized in Shueisha's seinen manga magazine Weekly Young Jump since December 26, 2019. Its chapters are collected and published by Shueisha into individual tankōbon volumes. The first volume was released on April 17, 2020. As of March 17, 2023, thirteen volumes have been released.

On July 2, 2021, Seven Seas Entertainment announced they licensed the series for English publication in North America in print and on digital platforms in single volume editions. The first volume was released on February 22, 2022.

Volume list

Chapters not yet in tankōbon format
These chapters have yet to be published in a tankōbon volume.

Anime
An anime television series adaptation was announced on March 14, 2023. It is produced by Bibury Animation Studios and directed by Hikaru Sato, with scripts supervised by Takashi Aoshima, and character designs handled by Akane Yano. The series is set to premiere in 2023.

Reception
By July 2021, the manga had over 800,000 copies in circulation by July of the same year. By March 2022, it had 1 million copies in circulation.

In August 2020, the series ranked second out of the 50 nominees on the sixth Next Manga Award, with 19,902 votes. The series ranked 19th on the 2021 Shinkan Manga Taishō by Tokyo Manga Reviewers. 

The series ranked eighth on AnimeJapan's fifth "Most Wanted Anime Adaptation" poll in 2022.

References

External links
  
  
 

Anime series based on manga
Bibury Animation Studios
Harem anime and manga
Polyamory in fiction
Romantic comedy anime and manga
Seinen manga
Seven Seas Entertainment titles
Shueisha manga
Upcoming anime television series